Cass County is the fifth solo studio album by American singer-songwriter Don Henley. The album was released on September 25, 2015, by Past Masters Holdings and Capitol Records. It is Don Henley's first new solo album in 15 years since 2000's Inside Job.

Background
In June 2015, Don Henley spoke about recording the album in Nashville, Tennessee, saying: "The great majority [of recording] was done right here in Nashville and I can truthfully say that I enjoyed making this record more than any record I've made in my career. And a lot of the reason is because of the people who participated. There's some amazing musicians here and the best thing about it is, most of them are funny. So it was a real pleasure."

The album is named after the East Texas county where Henley grew up.

Critical reception

Cass County received generally positive reviews from music critics. At Metacritic, which assigns a normalized rating out of 100 to reviews from mainstream critics, the album received an average score of 72 based on 9 reviews, which indicates "generally favorable reviews". David Icke of Rolling Stone said, "Written and produced with Stan Lynch, the original drummer in Tom Petty's Heartbreakers, Cass County is meticulously crafted, sharply written and absolutely free of neo-country additives like reheated Seventies-rock bombast and Twitter-verse vernacular." Dave Heaton of PopMatters stated, "At the album’s best, Henley conjures up the push-pull between restlessness and contentment in a way that jibes well with the musical interest in the traditions of the genre. At its worst, the album makes me want to throw it out the window, either for the cliches or more often the way the persona of the album comes from a lecturing place of “wisdom”; an I’ve-lived, so I know attitude." Jon Caramanica of The New York Times said, "The number and potency of these guests sometimes make Cass County sound like a tribute album to someone not yet gone. They also take away from Mr. Henley, now 68, whose voice has decayed nicely, though it now lacks the wise punch it had on The End of the Innocence, his excellent 1989 album."

Rolling Stone ranked the release at Number 20 on their Top 50 Best Albums of 2015, and Number 2 on their Top 40 Best Country Albums of 2015.

Commercial performance
The album debuted at number three on the Billboard 200 and number one on the Top Country Albums on its release. It was also the top selling album of the week, with 87,000 copies of pure albums sold in the United States. The album has sold 259,400 copies in the US as of August 2016.

Track listing
All tracks composed by Don Henley and Stan Lynch; except where indicated

Personnel

Musicians 

 Don Henley – lead vocals, lead guitar (12, 15)
 Mike Rojas – acoustic piano (2, 5, 11, 12), organ (5, 11), Wurlitzer electric piano (16)
 Tony Harrell – acoustic piano (4, 9, 10), organ (4, 9), harmonium (8, 13)
 Richard Davis – keyboards (5), organ (15), cello (15)
 John Deaderick – keyboards (7, 14)
 Richard Bowden – electric guitar (1, 4)
 Aaron Kelley – electric guitar (1), mandolin (1)
 Steuart Smith – acoustic guitar (1, 4, 6, 8–13, 16), electric guitar (2, 5, 9, 16), acoustic bass (2), acoustic piano (6), arrangements (13), bass guitar (15)
 Milo Deering – pedal steel guitar (1–4, 6, 10, 11, 15), fiddle (3, 6)
 Jim Hoke – mandolin (2), pedal steel guitar (12, 16)
 Vince Gill – electric guitar (3), harmony vocals (3, 11), acoustic guitar (11)
 Pat Buchanan – electric guitar (3, 11, 16), harmonica (3), acoustic guitar (12)
 Jerry Douglas – lap steel guitar (3)
 J.T. Corenflos – electric guitar (4, 9, 10, 13), acoustic guitar (8)
 Russ Pahl – pedal steel guitar (5, 8, 9) 
 Bryan Sutton – acoustic guitar (7, 14), mandolin (14)
 Jerry McPherson – electric guitar (7)
 Chris Holt – lead guitar (7)
 Stuart Duncan – mandolin (8), fiddle (8)
 Dan Dugmore – pedal steel guitar (10, 13), dobro (13)
 Rob Ickes – dobro (14)
 Gordon Kennedy – electric guitar (16)
 David Piltch – bass guitar (1, 6)
 Glenn Worf – bass guitar (2, 4, 5, 9, 10, 12), upright bass (8, 13)
 Jimmie Lee Sloas – bass guitar (7, 16)
 Michael Rhodes – bass guitar (11)
 Jimmy Johnson – bass guitar (14)
 Alex Hahn – drums (1, 6)
 Greg Morrow – drums (2–5, 7–13), percussion (4, 8, 12, 13)
 Will Henley – drums (3)
 Gregg Bissonette – drums (14)
 Shannon Forrest – drums (16), percussion (16)
 Matt Allen – percussion (3)
 Stan Lynch – percussion (3, 5, 7, 8, 9, 11, 14, 15, 16), acoustic guitar (5, 15), electric guitar (5, 14)
 Bill Chaplin – percussion (14)
 Marco Giovino – percussion (14)
 Mick Jagger – harmonica (1), lead vocals (1)
 David Moran – hammered dulcimer (11)
 Joe Bolero – tenor saxophone (12)
 Pat Gullota – trombone (12)
 Steve Falkner – trumpet (12)
 Herb Pedersen – arrangements (13)
 Miranda Lambert – lead vocals (1)
 Merle Haggard – lead vocals (2)
 Molly Felder – harmony vocals (4, 11, 13)
 Jamey Johnson – harmony vocals (4, 6)
 Lee Ann Womack – harmony vocals (4)
 Michelle Branch – harmony vocals (5)
 Sally Dworsky – harmony vocals (5)
 Gale Mayes – harmony vocals (5, 12)
 Angela Primm – harmony vocals (5, 12)
 Alison Krauss – harmony vocals (6, 8, 11)
 Martina McBride – harmony vocals (7)
 Trisha Yearwood – harmony vocals (9, 11, 16)
 Dolly Parton – lead vocals (10)
 Ashley Monroe – harmony vocals (11, 13), banjo (13)
 Martie Maguire – harmony vocals (13), fiddle (13)
 Emily Robison – harmony vocals (13)
 Lucinda Williams – harmony vocals (14)
 The Nashville Choir – choir (14)

Production 
 Producers – Don Henley and Stan Lynch
 Production assistant – Scott Johnson
 Engineers – Jeff Balding, Chris Bell, Gordon Hammond and Hank Linderman
 Additional engineers – Billy Chapin, Richard Davis and Tim Kimsey
 Assistant engineers – Matthew Allen, Sean Badum, Matt Coles, Tom Freitag, Nick Kallstrom, David Mikeal, Seth Morton, Seth Myers, Mike Stankiewicz, Adam Taylor, Christopher Wilkinson and Nathan Yarbourough
 Mixed by Jeff Balding at Blackbird Studio (Nashville, TN) and Opolona Studio (Los Angeles, California)
 Technician – Bill Lanham
 Mastered by Bob Ludwig at Gateway Mastering (Portland, Maine)
 Art direction and design – Jeri Heiden at SMOG Design
 Photography – Danny Clinch
 Additional photography – David McClister

Charts

Weekly charts

Year-end charts

References

2015 albums
Don Henley albums
Capitol Records albums
Cass County, Texas